The Gold Codes are the launch codes for nuclear weapons provided to the President of the United States in their role as commander-in-chief of the armed forces. In conjunction with the nuclear football, the Gold Codes allow the president to authorize a nuclear attack. Gold Codes, as well as a separate nuclear football, are also assigned to the vice president in case the president is incapacitated or otherwise unable to discharge the duties of office pursuant to the Twenty-fifth Amendment to the United States Constitution. Gold Codes are arranged in a column and printed on a plastic card nicknamed "the biscuit".

The card's size is similar to that of a credit card, and the president is supposed to carry it on their person. Before it can be read, an opaque plastic covering must be snapped in two and removed.

Gold Codes are generated daily and provided by the National Security Agency (NSA) to the White House, The Pentagon, United States Strategic Command and TACAMO.  For an extra level of security, the list of codes on the card includes codes that have no meaning, and therefore the president must memorize where on the list the correct code is located. The concept behind the codes is that they permit the president to present positive identification of being the commander-in-chief and thereby authenticate a launch order to the National Military Command Center (NMCC).

Protocol

Should the president decide to order the launch of nuclear weapons, the president would be taken aside by the carrier of the nuclear football and the briefcase would be opened. The president would then decide which attack options (specific orders for attacks on specific targets) to use. The attack options are preset war plans developed under OPLAN 8010, and include major attack options (MAOs), selected attack options (SAOs) and limited attack options (LAOs). The chosen attack option and the Gold Codes would then be transmitted to the NMCC via a special secure channel.

As commander-in-chief, the president is the only individual with the authority to order the use of nuclear weapons. The president and another high-ranking official, such as the vice president or secretary of defense, must jointly authenticate the order to use nuclear weapons. Nuclear-defense policy expert Franklin Miller states that the president has almost single authority to initiate a nuclear attack; though the secretary of defense is required to verify the order, they cannot legally veto it. However, Section 4 of the Twenty-fifth Amendment of the Constitution allows for the vice president, together with a majority of cabinet heads or Congress, to declare the president disabled or unfit to execute the duties of the office.

See also
 Emergency Action Message
 Multi-factor authentication
 National Command Authority (United States)
 Nuclear weapon control in the United Kingdom
 Operation Looking Glass
 Roger Fisher (academic), who proposed putting the nuclear codes inside a person so that the president has no choice but to take a life to activate the nuclear weapons

References

Further reading
 Finnis, John, Joseph Boyle, and Germain Grisez. "Nuclear Deterrence, Morality and Realism" (1988).
 Hansen, Chuck. "U.S. Nuclear Weapons: The Secret History" (1988).
 Jeutner, Valentin. "Irresolvable Norm Conflicts in International Law: The Concept of a Legal Dilemma" (2017).
 Williams, Stephen P. "How to be President: What to Do and where to Go Once You're in Office" (2004).

External links
 

United States nuclear command and control
Continuity of government in the United States